The seventh series of Junior Bake Off began on 10 January 2022, with 16 contestants competing to be crowned the series 7 winner. Comedian Harry Hill and bakers Liam Charles and Ravneet Gill returned as host and judges respectively. From episodes 1–3, Paul Hollywood stood in for Charles. The bakers will be divided into two groups of 8, with four eliminated from each group over five days of competition. The remaining four bakers from each group will be combined in the week-long finals, culminating in a "super-difficult showdown" episode that determines the winner. Kezia won the 2022 series.

Contestants
Source:

 Top 8
 Quarter finalist
 Semi-finalist
 Finalist
 Winner

Results summary

Heat 1

Heat 2

Finals

 Baker was one of the judges' least favourite bakers that episode, but was not eliminated.
 Baker was one of the judges' favourite bakers that episode, but was not the Star Baker.
 Baker got through to the next round.
 Baker was eliminated.
 Baker was the Star Baker.
 Baker was a series runner-up.
 Baker was the series winner.

Episodes

 Baker eliminated
 Star Baker
 Winner

Episode 1: Cake

Episode 2: Biscuits

Initially meant to be an 'Ice Cream Cone Piñata'

Episode 3: Bread

Episode 4: Dessert

Episode 5: Pastry

Episode 6: Cake

Episode 7: Biscuits

Episode 8: Bread

Episode 9: Dessert

Episode 10: Pastry

Episode 11: Chocolate

Episode 12: Super Snack

Episode 13: Magical

Due to an injury, Hill was not present for the judging of the showstopper.

Episode 14: Fruit (Semi-final)

Episode 15: Final

Ratings

References

The Great British Bake Off
2022 British television seasons